Crown Wood is a south-eastern estate of Bracknell in the English county of Berkshire, and formerly part of the parish of Winkfield.

Crown Wood was built during the late 1970s and is bounded in by Forest Park to the east, Harmans Water to the north and Birch Hill to the west and is east of the A322 Bagshot Road. It and Forest Park are in Crown Wood ward and named after the Crown Estate of Swinley Forest.

Facilities include a shopping centre, The Crown Wood public house, a community centre  doctors' surgery and Crown Wood Primary School .

References

Bracknell